The 7th Thailand National Games (Thai: กีฬาเขตแห่งประเทศไทย ครั้งที่ 7, also known as the 1973 National Games and the 1973 Interprovincial Games) were held in Nakhon Si Thammarat, Thailand from 23 to 29 February 1973, with contests in 14 sports and athletes from 10 regions.

Emblem
The emblem of 1973 Thailand National Games was a brown circle, with the Phra Boromathat Chedi or Phra That Nakhon on top, the emblem of the Sports Authority of Thailand on the inside, and surrounded by the text .

Participating regions
The 8th Thailand National Games represented 10 regions from 71 provinces.

Sports
The 1973 Thailand National Games featured 10 Olympic sports contested at the 1973 Southeast Asian Peninsular Games, 1974 Asian Games and 1976 Summer Olympics. In addition, four non-Olympic sports were featured: badminton, sepak takraw, table tennis and tennis.

References

External links
 Sports Authority of Thailand (SAT)

National Games
Thailand National Games
National Games
Thailand National Games
National Games